Chauvency-le-Château is a commune in the Meuse department in Grand Est in north-eastern France.

The  took place in 1285.  The story of the tournament has been told by trouvère Jacques Bretel, and is kept in a manuscript (reference: MS. Douce 308) at the Bodleian Library.

See also
 Communes of the Meuse department

References

Chauvencylechateau